Javid Chalabiyev (born 17 May 1992) is an amateur boxer from Azerbaijan who competes in the −56 kg bantamweight division. He won the 2013 World title and competed at the 2016 Summer Olympics, where he was eliminated in the first bout. He competed at the 2020 Summer Olympics where he was eliminated in the second round by Armenia's Hovhannes Bachkov.

Career highlights

References

Azerbaijani male boxers
Living people
1992 births
World boxing champions
Olympic boxers of Azerbaijan
Boxers at the 2016 Summer Olympics
European Games competitors for Azerbaijan
Boxers at the 2019 European Games
AIBA World Boxing Championships medalists
Bantamweight boxers
Boxers at the 2020 Summer Olympics